Thank God may refer to:

Thank God (song), a song by Hank Williams
"Thank God" (Kane Brown and Katelyn Brown song), from Kane Brown's 2022 album Different Man
Thank God (film) an Indian Hindi-language film
 "Thank God", a song by After Edmund from Hello
 Thank God Demo, a demo by Mindless Self Indulgence, or the title song

See also
 
 Deo gratias, "thanks be to God" in the Latin Rite
 Alhamdulillah, an Arabic phrase rendered in English as "Thank God" or "Praise God"
 Blessing, Texas, U.S., originally proposed name Thank God
 Dieu merci! (Thank God!), a French-language Quebec TV series based on the Australian series Thank God You're Here
Hallelujah, a Judeo-Christian phrase rendered in English as "Thank God" or "Praise God"